Palatinerpeton is an extinct genus of temnospondyl amphibian. Fossils have been found in the Lauterecken-Odernheim Formation of Germany.

Phylogeny
Palatinerpeton is one of several Late Carboniferous and Early Permian European temnospondyls with uncertain affinities; the others include Iberospondylus, Sclerocephalus, and Cheliderpeton. Phylogenetic studies have placed them as either early representatives of a group called Stereospondylomorpha, or close relatives of a group called Eryopidae. Stereospondylomorpha is a large clade mostly made up of Mesozoic taxa, while Eryopidae is a small family consisting of several Carboniferous and Permian temnospondyls. These two groups are usually considered distantly related. Schoch & Witzmann (2009) conducted a phylogenetic analysis in which Eryopidae and Stereospondylomorpha were found to be closely related, both members of a clade called Eryopoidea. Palatinerpeton was found to be the sister taxon of Eryopoidea. Below is a cladogram from their study:

References 

Permian temnospondyls of Europe
Prehistoric amphibian genera
Fossils of Germany
Fossil taxa described in 1996